Terry Beauford (born March 27, 1968) is a former American football player and coach. He served as the head football coach at Morehouse College in Atlanta, Georgia from 2005 to 2006, compiling a record of 5–16.

Beauford played college football at Florida A&M University and was selected by the San Diego Chargers in the seventh round of the 1991 NFL Draft.

Head coaching record

References

External links
 

1968 births
Living people
American football offensive guards
Florida A&M Rattlers football players
Green Bay Packers players
Hampton Pirates football coaches
Lane Dragons football coaches
Morehouse Maroon Tigers football coaches
San Diego Chargers players
Shreveport Pirates players
Tampa Bay Storm players
People from Fort Pierce, Florida
Coaches of American football from Florida
Players of American football from Florida
African-American coaches of American football
African-American players of American football
20th-century African-American sportspeople
21st-century African-American people